Lena 20 år is a compilation album released on 24 January 2007 from the Swedish pop singer Lena Philipsson. It peaked at number two on the Swedish Albums Chart.

Track listing
"Kärleken är evig" – 3:07
"Han jobbar i affär" – 3:48
"Det gör ont" – 3:01
"Dansa i neon" – 3:21
"Lena Anthem" – 4:12
"Om igen" – 3:04
"Åh Amadeus" – 3:31
"Stjärnorna" – 3:54
"Why (så lätt kommer du inte undan)" – 4:59
"Jag känner" ("Ti Sento") – 4:06
"På gatan där jag bor" – 4:10
"Standing in My Rain" – 4:43
"Bästa vänner" – 3:18
"Delirium" – 4:22
"Talking in Your Sleep" – 4:41
"Unga pojkar & äldre män" – 4:31
"006" – 4:23
"Månsken i augusti" – 4:21
"Jag måste skynda mig på" – 4:00 (duet Lena Philipsson-Orup)

Charts

References 

2007 compilation albums
Compilation albums by Swedish artists
Lena Philipsson compilation albums
Swedish-language compilation albums